Social franchising is the application of commercial franchising concepts to achieve socially beneficial ends, rather than profit.

Overview
Social franchising is the application of the principles of commercial franchising to promote social benefit rather than private profit.

In the first sense, it refers to a contractual relationship wherein an independent coordinating organization (usually a non-governmental organization, but occasionally a governmental body or private company) offers individual independent operators the ability to join into a franchise network for the provision of selected services over a specified area in accordance with an overall blueprint devised by the franchisor.  Once joining the network, operators are given the right to employ previously tested incentives including: professional training, use of brands or brand advertisements, subsidized or proprietary supplies and equipment, support services, and access to professional advice.  Members also gain beneficial spin-off effects such as increased consumer volume and improved reputation due to brand affiliation. Franchisees must adhere to a range of requirements including: providing socially beneficial services, meeting quality and pricing standards, undergoing mandatory education on provision of services, subjecting outlets to quality assurance mechanisms, reporting service and sales statistics, and occasionally, paying fixed or profit-share fees. Social franchises have been used for primary health services, pharmaceutical sales of essential drugs, HIV testing and counseling, and reproductive health services in the developing world.

A second application of social franchising is as a means of enabling social enterprises and the social economy to create more employment for disadvantaged people and achieve social aims. This is done principally by enabling joint working and knowledge sharing and transfer. The European Social Franchising Network has identified over 60 social franchises of this type in Europe, which employ over 13,000 people and more recently in 2012 The International Centre for Social Franchising identified 140. The largest of these is De Kringwinkel in Flanders employing 5,000 people. Others, like the Le Mat hotel and tourism social franchise or the School for Social Entrepreneurs operate in more than one country. Social franchising provides an opportunity to rapidly grow the sector to the benefit of disadvantaged people and society more generally.

Support Organisations
The international Centre for Social Franchising (ICSF) was founded to help replicate proven social ventures to scale. They have a number of useful resources and have published papers such as Investing in Social Franchising which looks at the viability of investment into franchised social enterprise in the UK and Social Franchising: Innovation and the Power of Old Ideas  which is a comparison between McDonald's and the social franchise Foodbank.

The ICSF has recently (2015) developed and launched a social franchising toolkit with NESTA, Bertelsmann Foundation, London School of Economics and others to help the best social ideas develop as a franchise. The group recently carried out research into replicable health care models with significant social benefit with GlaxoSmithKline the pharmaceutical company, published in May 2013.

Social franchising for health services
There are a number of social franchising set ups in the area of health care and social mobility.  According to the components of Human Development Index, "Health" and "Living Standards" are the two major components of HDI (Human Development Index). Social franchising for essential health services is an emerging technique used by governments and aid-donors in developing countries where a substantial percentage of health services are provided by private sector (including non-profit NGOs and private for-profit) to improve access, equity, effectiveness, and quality.  Clinical franchising often takes the form of a fractional model where franchised services are added to an existing medical practice, but also can exist as a stand-alone practice wherein the site exclusively provides franchise supported services or commodities. Social franchising has been used to deliver a wide range of services including  DOTS tuberculosis treatment, sexual transmitted infection management,  primary care, and HIV / AIDS treatment.

Strengths and weaknesses of social franchising

Strengths
By organizing small independent providers into larger units, social franchises can yield returns to scale in investment in physical capital, supply chains, advertising, and worker training and supervision. Additionally, social franchises can offer the ability to: faster scale up programs, decrease transaction costs, provide uniform services to a broad market, collectively negotiate financial reimbursement mechanisms, and replicate best practice services among a large group.  Franchisees can also cross-subsidize less profitable services with the more profitable ones supported by the franchisor.  The use of brand advertising makes social franchising compatible with social marketing. In addition, social franchising for health services allows an expansion of services because of cross-subsidization, addition of less-profitable services if fractionally franchised, and access to costly medicines if subsidized by the coordinating organization.

Weaknesses
Several inherent logistical and economic weaknesses are present within the social franchising model.  These include the difficulty in standardizing medical care among participants, the need for networks to be sufficiently large to attain an economy of scale, the cost and challenge of regulatory oversight of outlets, and the need to base organizational decisions on the population demand which may not maximize quality or minimize cost.  There also exists the possibility of “tragedy of the commons” wherein franchisees provide low quality, low cost due to incomplete monitoring. Social franchising for health services runs the risk of overly procedural, “cookie cutter” medical provision, overtreatment of disease conditions, and the possibility of fraud if oversight is not present.

Social Franchise Enterprises
The Social Franchise Enterprise is a type of Social initiative directed to achieve development goals through private ventures that provide goods and services to unserved markets, at a viable price. 
The Social Franchise enterprise creates self sustainable economic activity for the franchisees by using the franchise model to provide them with Capacity Building (know-how & training), Access to Market (bulk procurement of standard supplies, network clients, brand) and Access to Credit (benchmarking leading to Bankability). Franchisees then become capable to supply a given population with much needed goods or services.

By maintaining the transaction element, the Social Franchise Enterprise generates the revenue to both the Franchisees and to the Social Franchiser, who becomes self sustainable and can further extend its footprint and further supply unserved markets, enforce monitoring and continue to provide added value services to the Franchisees network.
  
Telephone/communication kiosks have been studied by the WB since 1995. Currently, rural electrification and rural mobile providers represent attractive fields to develop Social Franchise Enterprises that create economic activity and provide communities with electricity and access to communications.

History of Social Franchise Programs
The first significant implementation of social franchising was conducted in 1995 by the Greenstar franchise in Pakistan.  Since its inception, Greenstar has trained over 24,000 providers, and provides family planning, sexual and reproductive health services, maternal and child health services, and tuberculosis diagnosis and treatment through over 80,000 retail outlets.  Since then, over 35 additional social franchise programs have arisen, with much of the increase in the number and size of social franchises occurring in the last four years.  Franchises have additionally expanded their services from mostly family planning to testing and treatment of malaria, tuberculosis, and HIV / AIDS.

Existing Clinical Social Franchises

External links
 The International Centre for Social Franchising
 Private Healthcare in the Developing Countries section on Social Franchising
 Why Vitaloc Station targets health and social mobility issues
 Human Development Index

References

Health care
Franchising
International development
Social economy